Carter v. Carter Coal Company, 298 U.S. 238 (1936), is a United States Supreme Court decision interpreting the Commerce Clause of the United States Constitution, which permits the United States Congress to "regulate Commerce... among the several States." Specifically, it analyzes the extent of Congress’ power, according to the Commerce Clause, looking at whether or not they have the right to regulate manufacturing.

Background
The Bituminous Coal Conservation Act was passed in 1935 and replaced the previous codes set forth by the National Industry Recovery Act (NIRA). The new law established a commission, made up of coal miners, coal producers, and the public, to establish fair competition standards, production standards, wages, hours, and labor relations. All mines were required to pay a 15% tax on coal produced. Mines that complied with the Act would be refunded 90% of the 15% tax.

James W. Carter was a bitter foe of the United Mine Workers; he was a shareholder of the Carter Coal Company of McDowell County, West Virginia and did not feel that the company should join the government program. The board of directors for the company thought that the company could not afford to pay the tax if it did not receive anything back.

Carter sued the federal government and his own father who was also named Carter. The plaintiff claimed that coal mining was not interstate commerce and so could not be regulated by Congress.

The question was whether Congress, according to the Commerce Clause, has the power to regulate the coal mining industry.

Decision

Majority opinion
The Supreme Court majority ruled in favor of the plaintiff the younger Carter. The Supreme Court ruled 5-4 the Act was unconstitutional for the following reasons:

Just because a commodity is manufactured or produced within a state and is intended for interstate commerce does not mean that its "production or manufacturing is subject to federal regulation under the commerce clause."
A commodity that is meant to be sold in interstate commerce is not considered to be part of interstate commerce "before the commencement of its movement from the state."
"Mining is not interstate commerce." It is a local business and is subject to local control and taxation.
The word "commerce" is equivalent to the phrase "intercourse for the purposes of trade" and the process of mining coal is not within that definition.
The labor board has powers over production, not commerce. That confirms the idea that production is a purely-local activity.
If the production of coal by a single person did not have a direct effect on interstate commerce, the production of coal by many people also could not have a direct effect on interstate commerce.
The evils that Congress sought to control were "all local evils over which the federal government has no legislative control."
"The federal regulatory power ceases when interstate commerce ends; and, the power does not attach until interstate commercial intercourse begins."

Dissenting opinions
The Three Musketeers (Supreme Court) dissented.

Justice Cardozo, dissenting, reasoned that the price-fixing provision of the Coal Conservation Act was constitutional because it had a direct effect on interstate trade. Justices Stone and Brandeis joined Cardozo's opinion.

Chief Justice Hughes also wrote a separate opinion, agreeing with the other five justices that the Act's labor provision was unconstitutional because it was poorly drafted and did not fall within the jurisdiction of Congress to regulate interstate commerce. However, he mainly sided with Cardozo's opinion and noted that the Act's labor and marketing provisions were not dependent on each other. On April 12, 1937, however, Hughes, who wrote the majority opinion, later found the pro-labor Wagner Act constitutional in five separate cases and noted that it was skillfully drafted and specified interstate commerce regulations.

See also
 Carter Coal Company Store (Caretta, West Virginia)
 Carter Coal Company Store (Coalwood, West Virginia)
 List of United States Supreme Court cases, volume 298

References

Epstein, Lee, and Thomas G. Walker. Constitutional Law for a Changing America: Institutional Powers and Constraints. 6th ed. Washington D.C.: CQ P, 2007. 448-450.

External links
 
 Summary of Carter v. Carter Coal Company

United States Constitution Article One case law
United States Supreme Court cases
United States Supreme Court cases of the Hughes Court
United States Commerce Clause case law
1936 in United States case law
Coal mining in the United States
New Deal in West Virginia
McDowell County, West Virginia
United States lawsuits
Coal mining law
Constitutional challenges to the New Deal